The 1998 FIVB World Grand Prix was the sixth women's volleyball tournament of its kind, played by eight countries from 21 August to 13 September 1998. The final round was staged in Hong Kong.

Preliminary rounds

Ranking
The best four teams from the overall ranking are qualified for the final round.

|}

First round

Group A
Venue: Macau

|}

Group B
Venue: Chongqing, China

|}

Second round

Group C
Venue: Kaohsiung, Taiwan

|}

Group D
Venue: Bangkok, Thailand

|}

Third round

Group E
Venue: Chennai, India

|}

Group F
Venue: Shanghai, China

|}

Final round
Venue: Hong Kong

Final four

Semifinals

|}

3rd place match

|}

Final

|}

Final standings

Individual awards

Most Valuable Player:

Best Scorer:

Best Spiker:

Best Blocker:

Best Server:

Best Setter:

Best Receiver:

Dream Team

Setter:

Middle Blockers:

Outside Hitters:

Opposite Hitter:

References
Results

FIVB World Grand Prix
1998 in Hong Kong sport
International volleyball competitions hosted by Hong Kong
1998